Mac Amhlaoibh and Mac Amhalghaidh are two different Gaelic patronymic names with different origins and meanings, but which share the same or similar Anglicisations. These Gaelic names are borne by at least three unrelated native Irish clans or septs (a division or part of a clan).

The Mac Amhalghaidh sept was historically centred at Ballyloughloe in Co Westmeath; the Mac Amhlaoibh sept of the MacCarthy family was centred at Newmarket; and the Mac Amhlaoibh sept of the Maguire family was centred in the barony of Clanawley in County Fermanagh.

Etymology

Mac Amhalghaidh is the patronymic form of the Gaelic personal name Amhalghadh and means "son of Amhalghadh". The personal name Amhalghadh is of an uncertain origin.
Mac Amhlaoibh is the patronymic form of the Gaelic personal name  Amhlaoibh and means "son of Amhlaoibh". The personal name Amhlaoibh is a Gaelicisation of the Old Norse personal names Áleifr and Óláfr.

Today Anglicised forms of Mac Amhlaoibh and Mac Amhalghaidh include: Cauley, Caully, Cauly, Cawley, Cawly, Colley, Gawley, Macaulay, MacAuley, Macauley, MacAuliffe, MacAwley, MacCauley, MacCawley, MacGauley, Magawley, Magawly, McAulay, McAuley, McAuliffe, McAuly, McCaulay, McCauley, McCaully, McCauly, McCawley, McCawly, McGauley, MacAulay, McCowley, McColley, Macauley, McCooley, and Oliffe.

Mac Amhalghaidh (chiefs of Calraighe)

The Mac Amhalghaidh sept occupied lands located in what is today western Co Westmeath and northern Co Offaly. The heartland of the family was near Ballyloughloe, within the barony of Clonlonan, Co Westmeath, and was known in Elizabethan times as "MacGawleys Country". The sept derives its name from the Old Irish personal name Amhalgaidh. According to MacLysaght, the eponymous ancestor of the sept was an Amhalgaidh who lived in the 13th century. The sept is considered to be of native Irish descent. One pedigree of a family within the sept reaches back to Niall of the Nine Hostages and is stored in the genealogical office in Dublin. A genealogy of the sept is recorded in The O'Clery Book of Genealogies which is thought to have been written by Cú Choigcríche Ó Cléirigh in the 17th century. The genealogy is titled "Genelach Meg Amhlaibh Locha Luatha" and runs as follows:

In the 16th century the principal seat of the chiefs was Ballyloughloe Castle. The chiefs of the sept are recorded within the Annals of the Four Masters as the 'chiefs of Calraighe''' (which can be Anglicised as "Calry"). The chiefs are mentioned within the mediaeval topographical poems of Seán Mór Ó Dubhagáin and Giolla na Naomh Ó hUidhrín:

In the 19th century, the man considered chief of the name was Count Magawley Cerati. According to the 19th century historian John O'Donovan, all that remained of Magawley's Castle in 1837 was a single vault.

The so-called "Magawley's Chair" is one of two supposed inauguration "chairs" located in the Irish midlands. Both chairs are however considered dubious and are more likely 19th century fanciful creations. "Magawley's Chair" lies in the parish of Ballyloughloe (in the northern half of the barony of Clonlonan). It sits on a hill-slope overlooking the ruins of Carn Castle, which was the seat of Uilliam Mac Amhalghaidh in 1596. The "seat" itself is a rectangular shaped block of rough limestone that has a hollowed out recess on its northern face. The shape of the "seat" is oddly shaped and is considered to have been impractical for an inauguration stone. It has been dismissed as an old fodder trough by some. According to Elizabeth Fitzpatrick, it may have originated as a miniature folly from Carn Park House. The historian Dalton claimed that the inauguration chair of the "Magawley chiefs stood on the hillock now called Tullymagawley". Though according to Fitzpatrick, it is unclear whether Dalton was specifically referring to the chair or the family's seat of general authority. Tullymagawley (Tulach Mic Amhalghaidh) was one of the later mediaeval seats of the chiefs of the sept.

The arms of Arms of Valerio Magawly-Cerati (pictured) are blazoned argent a lion rampant and in chief two dexter hands gules; crest a demi lion rampant gules; motto LAIMH DEARGH ABOO; and supporters the black eagles of Austria. Magawly-Cerati was considered by Burke to have been the representer of the chiefs of Mac Amhalghaidh. In 1731, Philip Magawly was conferred the title 'Baron Calry' (Freiherr von und zu Calry) from Charles VI, Holy Roman Emperor. He was also created 'Count of Calry' in the Kingdom of Sicily (Conte di Calry) by the same monarch. He was succeeded by his grand-nephew, whom Valerio Magawly-Cerati descended from.

The sept recorded within the Irish Annals

Mac Amhlaoibh (sept of Mac Cárthaigh)

The Mac Amhlaoibh sept of Co Cork are a branch of Mac Cárthaigh (MacCarthy). MacLysaght stated that during the mid 20th century in Ireland, the name MacAuliffe was then usually found within Co Cork and hardly ever found outside of Munster. The chiefs of the sept resided at Castle MacAuliffe which was located near Newmarket, Co Cork. The territory of the sept was described in 1612 as "Clan Auliffe" (MacLysaght noted that "Clan Auliffe" is commonly used to describe a branch of the O'Farrells of Co Longford). The chiefs of the sept are mentioned within the mediaeval topographical poems of Seán Mór Ó Dubhagáin and Giolla-na-Naomh Ó hUuidrain:

A genealogy of the sept is recorded in The O'Clery Book of Genealogies which is thought to have been written by Cu Choigcriche O Cleirigh, one of the Four Masters, in the 17th century. The genealogy is titled "Genelach Meic Amlaibh Alla" and runs as follows:

According to Dalton, the last chief of the name was Michael MacAuliffe, a colonel in the Spanish army, who died in 1720. However O'Donovan stated the last chief was a minor official from Kenmare in 1840.

The coat of arms pictured is that of Dermot MacAuliffe and was first registered in the early 18th century. MacAuliffe was at the time considered the chief of the sept. The arms are blazoned argent three mermaids with combs and mirrors in fess azure between as many mullets of the last; crest a boar's head couped or. MacAuliffe was an officer in the Spanish Army. On 1 November 1709, the King of Spain combined several Irish units in his service, and formed the Ultonia Regiment which was commanded by MacAuliffe. In 1715, MacAuliffe was succeeded by Don Tadeo (Tadhg) MacAuliffe, who was later mortally wounded in 1718. Don Tadeo was then succeeded by Michael MacAuliffee, who was later killed in battle in 1720.

Ancestry chart

Illustrative diagram of the ancestry of the sept. The names in boldface are MacCarthy kings of Desmond with dates (reign, deposed, death). The chiefly line of the sept is stated to descend from a descendant of the first MacCarthy king.

Mac Amhlaoibh (sept of Mág Uidhir)

The Mac Amhlaoibh sept of Mág Uidhir (Maguire) originated in the area occupied within the present County Fermanagh, Northern Ireland. The sept is sometimes referred to as Clann Amlaimh or Clann Amhaoibh. The sept traces its descent from Amlaíb (d.1306), younger son of the first Maguire king of Fermanagh—Donn Óc (c.1286–1302) (also known as 'Donn Carrach Maguire'). Amlaib's family was one of the junior septs that dispossessed non-Maguire families in the area of the Maguire lordship. The family established itself in Muinntear Peodacháin, near Lough Erne, dispossessing the Mac Gille Fhinnéin chieftain. In consequence of their military actions the family eventually left its mark on the area in the name of the barony of Clanawley in Co Fermanagh.

The sept recorded within the Irish Annals

The sons of Amhlaoibh and descendants are recorded within the Annals of Ulster and the Annals of the Four MastersSee also
 Irish nobility
 Uí Néill
 Eóganachta
 Airgíalla
 Clan MacAulay, unrelated Scottish clan with a name derived from Amhalghadh Macaulay of Lewis, unrelated Scottish clan(s) with a name derived from Amhlaoibh''

Notes

References

History of County Cork
History of County Offaly
History of County Westmeath
History of County Fermanagh
Irish families
Irish-language surnames